TV Celje is a regional television station in Slovenia, based in Celje.

External links
 TV Celje official website

Celje
Mass media in Celje